Dyserth railway station served the village of Dyserth, Flintshire (now Denbighshire), Wales. It was the southern terminus of the  Dyserth branch, most of which is now a public footpath. At its peak Dyserth had passengers in the thousands. In 1930 the line and station closed for passengers in the face of road competition. At one point fourteen trains a day had shuttled along the line. Although the station has long been demolished, a crane from the station has been installed at the end of the walk as a feature of historical interest, as have two pieces of track at Chapel Street.

The branch line to Dyserth was opened by the LNWR in 1869, initially for mineral traffic only. A passenger service was instituted in 1905 but lasted only until 1930, when it was withdrawn by the LMS. Despite being closed the station site was host to two LMS caravans from 1934 to 1939. The line remained open to serve a quarry at Dyserth until complete closure in 1973.

References

Sources

Further reading

 
 
 
 
 
 
 

Disused railway stations in Denbighshire
Former London and North Western Railway stations
Railway stations in Great Britain opened in 1905
Railway stations in Great Britain closed in 1930